The Huangguan Escalator (also known as the Lianglukou Escalator) is an escalator in Chongqing, China. 

Constructed in 1993 and completed in 1996, the Huangguan Escalator was the highest single-grading escalator in China and Asia when it was built. Currently, it is the third highest escalator in Asia, after the escalator in Rustaveli station in the Tbilisi Metro (60 meters high) and an escalator in Pyongyang, North Korea. Due to the hilly nature of the terrain, the Lianglukou metro station is at the top of the escalator while the Chongqing railway station is at the bottom.

The escalator replaced an earlier funicular railway. The material used for building the escalator was imported, and the design and construction were directed by a local engineer, who also directed the construction of Chongqing Amusement Park. 

There is a small charge for using the escalator, and it is monitored by a supervisor at each end. It takes 2.5 minutes for a passenger to finish a one-way trip on the escalator. 

The escalator plays a key role in the civil transportation of the mountainous city Chongqing.

References 

Yuzhong District
Vertical transport devices
Transport in Chongqing